Tennis returned to the Summer Olympic Games at the 1988 Summer Olympics in Seoul, having been left out since the 1924 Summer Olympics in Paris.  Tennis had been a demonstration sport at the  1968 and 1984 Summer Olympics.

The tournament took place from September 20 - October 1 on outdoor hardcourts at the Seoul Olympic Park Tennis Center.

Medal summary

Events

Medal table

References
Official Olympic Report

 
1988
1988 Summer Olympics events
Olympics
1988 Olympics